İsmail Çokçalış (born 21 June 2000) is a Turkish professional footballer who plays as a right-back for Adana Demirspor.

Professional career
A youth product of Bursaspor, İsmail signed his first professional contract on 26 March 2018. İsmail made his professional debut for Bursaspor in a 1-0 Süper Lig loss to Gençlerbirliği S.K. on 18 May 2018. On 14 January 2022, he transferred to Adana Demirspor.

International career
İsmail is a youth international for Turkey, and was a member of the Turkey U17s at the 2017 UEFA European Under-17 Championship. İsmail represented the Turkey U23s in their winning campaign at the 2021 Islamic Solidarity Games.

Honours
Turkey U23
Islamic Solidarity Games: 2021

References

External links
 
 
 
 

2000 births
Living people
People from Osmangazi
Turkish footballers
Turkey under-21 international footballers
Turkey youth international footballers
Bursaspor footballers
Karacabey Belediyespor footballers
Adana Demirspor footballers
Süper Lig players
TFF First League players
Association football fullbacks